Andrea Doninelli (born 29 April 1991) is an Italian football midfielder.

References

External links
 
 

1991 births
Living people
Sportspeople from Cosenza
Italian footballers
Association football midfielders
Genoa C.F.C. players
Hellas Verona F.C. players
S.S. Juve Stabia players
Benevento Calcio players
Modena F.C. players
A.C. Renate players
Serie B players
Serie C players
Footballers from Calabria